Michal Mertiňák and Lovro Zovko were the defending champions, but they chose to not compete this year.
Denis Istomin and Evgeny Korolev won the final 6–7(4), 7–6(4), [11–9], against Alejandro Falla and Teymuraz Gabashvili.

Seeds

Draw

Draw

References
 Doubles Draw

Ethias Trophy - Doubles
2009 Ethias Trophy